Belknap Township may refer to:
Belknap Township, Pottawattamie County, Iowa
Belknap Township, Michigan